Tellurium oxide may refer to:

Tellurium monoxide, TeO
Tellurium dioxide, TeO2
Tellurium trioxide, TeO3